The M40 field protective mask was one of various protective masks used by the United States Armed Forces and its allies to protect from field concentrations of chemical and biological agents, along with radiological fallout particles. It is not effective in an oxygen deficient environment or against ammonia.

History

The M40 was the result of a program in the 1980s to develop a successor to the M17-series protective masks which had been in service with the US armed forces since 1959. The M40 was to be a return to conventional protective mask design with an external side-mounted filter canister, rather than the internal cheek filters of the M17, which were awkward to change, especially in a contaminated environment. The final prototype, the XM40, was approved for service and then designated the M40.

The M40 was phased into service with the U.S. Army and Marine Corps in the mid-1990s, with another new design, the MCU-2/P also replacing the older M17 in service with the U.S. Air Force and Navy. However, both masks suffered from the inadequate protective capabilities of their face pieces, which was of a silicone rubber susceptible to corrosion from blister agents. Thus, the masks were effectively ill-suited for protecting against much more than riot control agents, and a butyl rubber 'second skin' had to be quickly issued for fitting over and reinforcing the M40 facepiece to make it effective in its intended role.

The M42 series masks are a variant of this mask with alterations that make it better suited for use by armored vehicle crews, who have to connect their masks to and draw air from their vehicle's own filtration system.

The M40 field protective mask is currently being replaced by the M50 joint service general purpose mask.

On September 2, 2017, the Philippine Marine Corps received 1,000 M40 gas masks and C2 filters through the U.S. Embassy's  Mutual Logistics Support Agreement program.

Design
The M40 field protective mask features three voicemitters, one on either the right or left side, and one in front. A voicecom adapter may be placed over the front voicemitter to amplify the user's voice. The mask can be adjusted in the field to accept the filtering canister on either side, so that a weapon may be shouldered. Right-handed shooters will normally locate the canister on the left side of the mask and vice versa.

The C2 canister on the M40 mask can protect the user from up to 15 nerve, choking, and blister agent attacks, and two blood agent attacks.

The M40 comes with a drinking system that allows the user to drink water after donning the mask for long periods of time in a chemically contaminated environment.  In order to use the drinking system the user must also have suitably equipped canteen lids or an adapter for other containers.

Users

Current

 : In service with the Philippine Army and Philippine Marine Corps, supplied from the Joint U.S. Military Assistance Group.

Former

 : Replaced by the M50 joint service general purpose mask in active service. Still used by U.S. Army Reserve and National Guard units and the U.S. Marine Corps Reserve as of 2021.

References

United States Marine Corps equipment
Gas masks of the United States
Military equipment introduced in the 1990s